Paratroop Command is a 1959 American war film directed by William Witney, starring Richard Bakalyan, Ken Lynch and Jack Hogan. American International Pictures originally released the film as a double feature with Submarine Seahawk.

Plot
Charlie is a paratrooper that is mistaken for a coward by fellow soldier Ace because he lies still in an attempt to ambush a group of German soldiers. He then suffers the scorn of his unit because he accidentally kills his friend Cowboy, who was wearing a German uniform in an attempt to infiltrate enemy lines, and was apparently holding a gun on the rest of the squad. Ace threatens him, and in subsequent action in Salerno, curses him with his dying breath. Charlie is hanging from a tree in his parachute and carrying a vital generator, with both the Lieutenant and Sargeant wounded, on the wrong side of a road that is mined. Following the Lieutenant's instructions, he clears the mines with hand grenades, but a dud grenade leaves him stranded and short of his destination. Sacrificing his life, he runs the final distance and explodes the remaining mine.    . The film is set in World War II in North Africa, Sicily, and Italy.

Cast
As appearing in screen credits (main roles identified):

A full cast and production crew list is too lengthy to include, see: IMDb profile.

Reception
Quentin Tarantino, an admirer of Witney's work, considers this film to be among his four best. Tarantino called it "the best of American-International’s WW2 potboilers. But I think it’s even better than that. It contains a realism that sets it apart from most other WW2 movies done in that same era. So much so that it makes a lot of good and similar movies from that same time, Robert Aldrich’s Attack and Don Siegel’s Hell is for Heroes, look theatrical and stagey by comparison."

References

External links 
 
 
 

1959 films
1959 war films
American World War II films
American International Pictures films
Films directed by William Witney
Films scored by Ronald Stein
1950s English-language films
1950s American films